"Touch" is a song by Australian rock-pop band Noiseworks. It was released in October 1988 as the first single from their second studio album Touch (1988) and peaked at number 12 on the ARIA singles chart.

In July 2012, Jon Stevens (of Noiseworks) teamed up with production outfit Silver Sneakerz for a dance remix of "Touch".  It was released on dance label Hussle Recordings (a division of Ministry of Sound). They performed the track live on The X Factor (Australia season 4) on 30 October 2012.

Track listing
7" vinyl / CD single (653010 7)

12" vinyl/ European maxi single (653010 3)

Charts

External links
 https://www.discogs.com/Noiseworks-Touch/master/136058

References

Noiseworks songs
1988 songs
1988 singles
2012 singles
Jon Stevens songs
CBS Records singles
Songs written by Steve Balbi
Songs written by Jon Stevens
Songs written by Justin Stanley